Robert Hall Morrison was the first president of Davidson College. Morrison, originally from Cabarrus County, North Carolina, enrolled at the University of North Carolina at Chapel Hill, eventually graduating second in the class, behind future President James K. Polk. After graduating, Morrison entered the ministry before being appointed as president of Davidson. Morrison taught mathematics and science courses at the college.  After a year as president, a typhoid fever epidemic swept through the area, taking two of his children. Morrison would later become ill and resign from the position in 1840, eventually retiring in 1849.

References

External links 
 Biography from the Davidson College Archives & Special Collections
 Biography from NCpedia

1798 births
1889 deaths
American Presbyterian ministers
Presidents of Davidson College
University of North Carolina at Chapel Hill alumni
19th-century American clergy